Harbour Grace is a town in Conception Bay on the Avalon Peninsula in the province of Newfoundland and Labrador, Canada. With roots dating back to the 16th century, it is one of the oldest towns in North America.

The town has a population of 2,796 (2021), engaged primarily in fishing and fish processing. The alternative spelling of Harbor Grace was current at one time.

History
Harbour Grace was founded in 1517 by the French king Francis I.  It was an important port and fishing centre from the earliest days of European exploration of North America and was a thriving seasonal fishing community by 1550, with permanent settlement beginning in 1583 (24 years before the Jamestown, Virginia colony, often incorrectly cited as the first permanent English settlement in North America, and two years before the lost colony at Roanoke, North Carolina). The first year-round settler that year was Robert Tossey of Dartmouth, England.

The town was named after Havre de Grâce (now Le Havre), France, although it is uncertain whether the name was given by French cartographers, Francis I of France, or early settlers from the British Channel Islands and West Country who were familiar with Le Havre as a common trade destination for fishermen from the Channel Islands.

In 1610, pirate Peter Easton made Harbour Grace his headquarters, and established a fort overlooking the bay. Although it was attacked by the French the following year, the early settlement survived throughout the 17th century, with a permanent, year-round population numbering a few dozen, swelling to several hundred during the fishing season.

In 1618, Bristol's Society of Merchant Venturers received a charter from King James I of England to establish a settlement near Harbour Grace, "Bristol's Hope", and appointed Robert Hayman as its first Proprietary Governor, a post he held for the next ten years. He was back in London at the end of this period in 1628. Hayman published a work of pithy epigrams called Quodlibets which he had written in Harbour Grace; it was the first book written in the new world. The Conception Bay area is referred to in the subtitle of his book not as "Conception Bay" but by its original, though now largely forgotten, name of New Britanolia.

Over the coming years, control of Harbour Grace became a point of contention between the English and the French. The town, with a population numbering about 100, was razed by the French in 1697, again in 1700, and captured briefly in 1762. Nevertheless, between these attacks, the population grew by 50%. By 1771, the population was close to 5,800. By then, however, other colonial towns along the Atlantic coast had surpassed Harbour Grace in population and influence. The town continued to grow and peaked in population in 1921, when the census was taken at 11,458 residents.

As trans-Atlantic aviation became more popular in the 1920s and 1930s, many aviation pioneers, among them Amelia Earhart and Thor Solberg chose to make their crossing from the nearby Harbour Grace airfield due to its proximity to continental Europe. Altogether, some twenty flights left Harbour Grace from 1919 to 1936 in their attempts to cross the Atlantic.

In July 1941, the Royal Canadian Navy established a High Frequency Direction Finding wireless station on the airfield. Consisting of an Operations Building and a Direction Finding shack, the station had an uninterrupted sweep of the northern Atlantic sector and was able to provide bearings on U-boat transmissions and to intercept enemy radio traffic.

Harbour Grace was one of the first sites that the Royal Canadian Navy was solely responsible for after war broke out. On May 21, 1945, the Canadian Naval Service approved closing down and disposing of its facility at Harbour Grace. There is no evidence of the station today. Following WWII, the airstrip was left to deteriorate. In 1977, through the efforts of the Harbour Grace Historical Society, it was restored to a usable condition. In 1999, after years of being considered abandoned, the airstrip was reinstated to official international airdrome status under the designator of CHG2.

Today, Harbour Grace continues its tradition as a fishing and fish processing centre. In addition, because of its rich history and many historical buildings, including the 1870 customs house, now the Conception Bay Museum, a small tourist industry is emerging. The Gordon G. Pike Railway Heritage Museum and Park (c. 1881–1884) was designated a Municipal Heritage Building in 2006.

Demographics 

History briefs

 
 The first English account of the capture of St. John's by the French came from Harbour Grace Island in 1708.
 Laurence Coughlan, credited as the founder of Methodism in Newfoundland, laid the foundations of Newfoundland's first Methodist movement when he served as an Anglican priest in Harbour Grace from 1766 to 1773.
 The Harbour Grace Court House, constructed in 1830, is the oldest surviving public building in the province and a National Historic Site of Canada.
 St. Paul's Anglican Church in Harbour Grace was built in 1835, making it the oldest stone church in Newfoundland and Labrador.
 The Harbour Grace Regatta, held annually since 1862, is the second-oldest continuing sporting event in North America. 
 Built around 1867, the Masonic building of Lodge Harbour Grace No. 476 A.F. & A.M. S.C., is the oldest wooden Masonic meeting house in Canada.
 The first railway line in Newfoundland was completed to Harbour Grace in 1884.
 The first flight by a Canadian from North America to England embarked October 9, 1930, in the plane Maple Leaf (aka Columbia), piloted by Capt. J. Erroll Boyd (1891–1960) and was navigated by the American, Lieut. Harry Connor. This flight was also notable for transporting mail bearing a surcharged stamp as a commemorative overprint. The aviators borrowed a Webley & Scott flare pistol to carry during the flight from Edward Langdon Oke, a former Sergeant with the Royal Newfoundland Regiment in World War I. The aviators had the gun engraved to mark the historic flight and it resides in the collection at the Conception Bay Museum. Amelia Earhart took flight from Harbour Grace on May 20, 1932, to become the first woman to fly solo across the Atlantic. The early transatlantic flights from the Harbour Grace airfield were designated Events of National Historic Significance. 
 The hand-operated, iron "Washington" press, manufactured by R. Hoe & Company, was used in Harbour Grace for more than a century—1850 to 1962. The press was purchased from Munn & Oke, Ltd by Memorial University, now named "Pitcher Plant Press", and is on display in the Queen Elizabeth II Library (Memorial University, St. John's, Newfoundland and Labrador).

Notable residents

Daniel Cleary (born 1978) is a former NHL winger, notably for the Detroit Red Wings. In 2008, he became the first player  from Newfoundland and Labrador to win the Stanley Cup. Danny Cleary Arena is named in his honour.
George Webber (born 1820) was a newspaperman and poet.
Robert John Parsons (1802–1883) was a journalist and politician in Harbour Grace. He was the owner of the Newfoundland Patriot newspaper.
William Austin Oke (1857–1923) was a newspaper publisher, politician, and District Court judge. He represented Harbour Grace in the Newfoundland House of Assembly for three terms, from 1898 to 1908, as a Liberal.
Prof Ian Maclaren Thompson FRSC FRSE (1896–1981), anatomist. Founder and first President of the Canadian Association of Anatomists and President of the Manitoba Museum.
Robert Oke (1794–1870) was the first Chief Inspector for the Newfoundland Lighthouse Service and served from 1855 to 1870. He published several books, including two books of early Newfoundland lighthouse designs in 1860 and 1861, with a revised edition of the latter in 1865. Oke installed the first light mechanism (from Bell Rock Lighthouse) at the Cape Bonavista Light in 1842, and installed the famous Isle of May light mechanism at the Cape Pine Light in 1850, which was later moved to Harbour Grace Island and finally to Cape Bonavista, where it can be viewed today.

See also

 List of cities and towns in Newfoundland and Labrador
 Newfoundland Railway

References

Populated coastal places in Canada
Towns in Newfoundland and Labrador
Populated places established in 1517
1583 establishments in the British Empire
1517 establishments in North America